Harpyia longipennis is a moth in the family Notodontidae. It is found in south-east Asia, including India and Thailand.

Subspecies
Harpyia longipennis longipennis
Harpyia longipennis yunnanensis Schintlmeister & Fang, 2001 (Yunnan)

Notodontidae